Zammeh (also Romanized as Zameh and Zemeh) is a village in Belharat Rural District, Miyan Jolgeh District, Nishapur County, Razavi Khorasan Province, Iran. At the 2006 census, its population was 456, in 128 families.

References 

Populated places in Nishapur County